Yannick Bodin (born August 8, 1942 in Dinan, Côtes-d'Armor) is a former member of the Senate of France, who represented the Seine-et-Marne department.  He is a member of the Socialist Party.

References
Page on the Senate website

1942 births
Living people
People from Dinan
Socialist Party (France) politicians
French Senators of the Fifth Republic
Senators of Seine-et-Marne